Don Henson (born September 19, 1973), known professionally as Jeremy Jordan, is an American singer and actor from Hammond, Indiana.

Biography
Jordan's real name is Don Henson. He was born September 19, 1973, and his mother gave custody of him to his father, who later married another woman and had four more children, all of whom he placed in Mooseheart Child City (an orphanage) after his wife died from leukemia. Once they got to the orphanage, he and his brothers and sisters were separated and every year he spent there, from the third to eleventh grade, he had a different set of houseparents, some of them very violent. Jordan wanted to get involved in movies and sign with a talent agency in Chicago, but was forbidden since the orphanage was in Mooseheart (near North Aurora), forty miles away. When he was seventeen, before Thanksgiving 1991, he moved to Chicago to stay with a friend's parents. After a fight he was evicted from the house where he was living and ended up homeless, living in the subway until he met his manager Peter Schivarelli. He then signed a record deal with his record company.

In 1993, Jordan released Try My Love on Giant Records. The album yielded the international hit singles, "The Right Kind of Love" (#5 Billboard Hot 100 Airplay, #14 Billboard Hot 100 Singles, #4 Billboard Top 40 Mainstream, #22 Billboard Rhythmic Top 40), produced and written by Lotti Golden, Tommy Faragher & Robbie Nevil, and "Wannagirl" (#11 Billboard Top 40 Mainstream, #24 Billboard Rhythmic Top 40, #28 Billboard Hot 100). "The Right Kind of Love" peaked just inside the top 20 of the Billboard Hot 100. Jordan's debut album and "Wannagirl" had great success on the American charts. In 2009, Jordan released a new song entitled "Forgotten People." The song and its video are about homeless people.

Additionally, "My Love is Good Enough" and "Try My Love" were featured in the film Airborne. "The Right Kind of Love" music video was featured during the end credits of Beverly Hills, 90210 and was also on the television series' soundtrack. His popularity, music wise, peaked with concerts around the globe.

A remix album, Jeremy The Remix, was released to overseas markets in late 1993. Since 1994, Jordan has transitioned into acting and has appeared in a number of films, including Never Been Kissed with Drew Barrymore, Falling Sky with Brittany Murphy, television films like Twisted Desire with Melissa Joan Hart, as well as independent films such as Leaving Las Vegas with Nicolas Cage, Julian Po with Christian Slater, and Nowhere directed by Gregg Araki.

Films and television
1994: ABC Afterschool Specials (1 installment: Boys Will Be Boys)
1995: Live Nude Girls
1995: Leaving Las Vegas
1996: Twisted Desire
1996: The Drew Carey Show
1996: Ellen
1996: Bio-Dome
1996: Poolboy
1997: Julian Po
1997: Subway Stories: Tales from the Underground
1997: Nowhere
1997: Gun (1 episode: "Ricochet")
1997: Skeletons
1998: Falling Sky
1999: Never Been Kissed
1999: Storm of the Century
1999: Dreamers
2010: The Absent
2010: Raspberry & Lavender: Diaries of a Lavender Girl

Discography

Studio albums

Compilation albums

Singles

References

External links

Jeremy Jordan Acting Reel
[ Jeremy Jordan] at Allmusic
Jeremy Jordan at Discogs

20th-century American singers
American male film actors
Living people
Giant Records (Warner) artists
People from Hammond, Indiana
American contemporary R&B singers
Singers from Indiana
20th-century American male singers
1973 births